Rosemont is an unincorporated community in Mahoning County, in the U.S. state of Ohio.

History
A post office called Rosemont was established in 1888, and remained in operation until 1928. Besides the post office, Rosemont had a country store, operated by D. L. Rose. Early industries at Rosemont included two mills and two coal mines.

References

Unincorporated communities in Mahoning County, Ohio
1888 establishments in Ohio
Populated places established in 1888
Unincorporated communities in Ohio